Louise O'Sullivan is a former Montreal city councillor and member of the city's executive committee. She is the founder and leader of Parti Montréal Ville-Marie. She was a candidate for Mayor of Montreal in the city's 2009 Municipal Elections.

City councillor (2002-2005)
She was originally elected in 2001, to represent the Peter-McGill district as a councillor under Gérald Tremblay's Union Montreal party. Tremblay named her to the city's executive committee, where she was responsible for the social development/revenue security and the Business Centre portfolios. Due to a disagreement with the Tremblay administration, she resigned from the executive committee and Union Montréal and spent the rest of her time in council sitting as an independent. For the 2005 municipal elections, she created Équipe Ville-Marie. For the 2009 municipals, this became Parti Montréal Ville-Marie.

2006 federal election
During the 2006 Canadian federal election, O'Sullivan ran for the Conservative Party of Canada in the riding of Westmount—Ville-Marie. She was defeated by incumbent, Lucienne Robillard, of the Liberal Party of Canada.

2009 mayoral campaign

Louise O'Sullivan ran as a mayoral candidate in Montreal during the 2009 municipal elections for Parti Montréal Ville-Marie. <div style="display:none">.

External links
Parti Montréal Ville-Marie

References

Montreal city councillors
Women in Quebec politics
Quebec candidates for Member of Parliament
Conservative Party of Canada candidates for the Canadian House of Commons
Year of birth missing (living people)
Living people
Women municipal councillors in Canada
21st-century Canadian women politicians